Carrollton Public Schools is a public school district headquartered in Carrollton Township, Michigan. It is a part of the Saginaw Intermediate School District and serves the Carrollton Township area. Its schools include Carrollton Elementary School, Carrollton Middle School, and Carrollton High School.

References

External links

 Carrollton Public Schools

School districts in Michigan
Saginaw Intermediate School District